May Claerhout (21 February 1939 – 7 November 2016) was a Belgian artist who was born in Pittem. She created sculptures in bronze and terracotta, and she created several statues for public buildings in Belgium. Her studio was located in Malle. Claerhout was married to Armand Storms and together they had three children.

Works

 Statue Europe (bronze, 20 December 1993), in the Espace Léopold, the complex of parliament buildings in Brussels housing the European Parliament, given by the Belgian presidency Espace Léopold
 Statue Father Damien (bronze)
 5 Continents (bronze)
 History of scripture (bronze)
 Birth of Mankind (bronze)
 Metro in the city (red terracotta, Metrostation Opera on crossing Keizerlei and Meir, Antwerp)
 City, Stream en Metro (white, glazed terracotta, Metrostation Frederik van Eden, Leftbank, Antwerp)
 Union (white, glazed terracotta)
 Ziekenzorg (red terracotta)
 Generations (red terracotta)
 Debat (red terracotta)
 Aula (white, glazed terracotta)

References

 Tourism in Malle (Dutch)
 May Claerhout, De kunst van May Claerhout, Mercatorfonds & Arcade, (1977), 
 Gaby Gyselen, May Claerhout, Ons Erfdeel (1979), nr 3, pp. 406–411

1939 births
2016 deaths
Flemish sculptors (before 1830)
People from Malle
People from West Flanders
20th-century Belgian women artists
20th-century Belgian sculptors
21st-century Belgian sculptors
21st-century Belgian women artists